Standing Committee for Scientific and Technological Cooperation (COMSTECH) is one of four standing committees of the Organisation of Islamic Cooperation dedicated to the promotion and cooperation of science and technology activities among the OIC member states.

Foundation 
COMSTECH was established by the OIC's Islamic Summit in Mecca on 1981 and comprises the OIC member states for the sake of building on indigenous capabilities in science and technology, promotion and cooperation in relevant areas, and establishment of institutional structure for planning and development at Ummah level.

Objectives 
Their stated objectives are:
Assessment of the human and material resources of OIC member states and determination of science and technology needs and requirements.
Building up the indigenous capability of member states in the fields of science and technology through cooperation and mutual assistance.
Promotion of cooperation and coordination amongst the member states in science and technology. Creation of an effective institutional structure of planning, research and development and monitoring of science and technology activities in high technology areas.

Inter-Library Resource Network 
The Inter-Library Resource Network Service is a programme that networks libraries of the OIC member states, requiring all member institutions to provide free access to the users of other members.

In 2007 the journal holdings of 45 libraries from 15 OIC members had been networked, and the same figures were reported in early 2009. , COMSTECH lists the following 48 libraries as part of the network:
 Al Al-Bayt University, Amman, Jordan
 Abdullahi Fodiyo Library Complex, Usmanu Danfodiyo University, Sokoto, Nigeria
 Allama I.I. Kazi Library, University of Sindh, Jamshoro, Pakistan
 Applied Sciences University, Amman, Jordan
 Arid Agriculture University, Rawalpindi, Pakistan.
 Bangladesh Agriculture University, Mymensingh, Bangladesh
 Bangladesh Council of Scientific and Industrial Research (BCSIR) Library, Dhaka, Bangladesh
 Bangladesh Institute of Research & Rehabilitation in Diabetes, Endocrine & Metabolic Disorders (BIRDEM) Shahbagh, Dhaka, Bangladesh
 Bangladesh National Scientific and Technical Documentation Centre (BANSDOC) Library, Mirpore Road, Dhanmondi, Dhaka-1205, Bangladesh
 Bangladesh University of Engineering & Technology, Dhaka, Bangladesh
 Bangladesh University of Science & Technology, Dhaka, Bangladesh bd.drik.net 
 Bilkent University, Ankara, Turkey
 Central Library, Bahauddin Zakariya University, Multan, Pakistan
 Central Library, N.W.F.P. University of Engineering & Technology, Peshawar, Pakistan
 Dhaka Medical College, Dhaka, Bangladesh
 Dhaka University Library, Dhaka, Bangladesh
 Dr. Raziuddin Siddiqi Memorial Library, Quaid-e-Azam University, Islamabad, Pakistan
 HEJ Research Institute of Chemistry, University of Karachi, Karachi, Pakistan
 Institut Teknologi Sepuluh Nopember, Sukolilo, East Java, Indonesia
 International Center for Agricultural Research in the Dry Areas (ICARDA), Aleppo, Syria
 International Centre for Diarrhoeal Disease Research, Bangladesh (ICDDRB)
 International Institute of Earthquake Engineering and Seismology (IIEES), Iran
 International Islamic University, Islamabad, Pakistan
 Iranian University of Science & Technology, Tehran, Iran
 Jordan University of Science & Technology, Jordan
 King Abdul Aziz City for Science and Technology (KACST), Saudi Arabia
 Kuwait Institute for Scientific Research (KISR)
 Lahore University of Management Sciences (LUMS), Graduate School of Business Administration, Lahore Pakistan
 Mohammad V University, Rabat, Morocco 
 Ondokuz Mayıs University, Kurupelit, Samsun 55139,Turkey 
 Pakistan Institute of Nuclear Science and Technology, Nilore, Islamabad, Pakistan
 Shah Abdul Latif University, Khairpur Sindh, Pakistan
 Regional Information Center for Science & Technology, Shiraz University, Shiraz, Iran
 Sultan Qaboos University, Musqat, Oman
 Universitas Katolik Indonesia Atma Jaya, Jakarta, Indonesia
 Universite Cheikh Anta Diop, Dakar, Senegal
 Universite De Saint-Louis, Saint-Louis, Senegal
 Universiti Sains Malaysia, Penang, Malaysia
 University of Agriculture, Faisalabad, Pakistan
 University of Peshawar, Peshawar, Pakistan
 University of Punjab, Lahore, Pakistan
 University of Qatar, Doha, Qatar
 University of Uyo, Uyo, Akwa Ibom State, Nigeria.
 Usmanu Danfodiyo University Library, Sokoto, Nigeria
 Yarmouk University, Irbid, Jordan
 Satellite Research & Development Center, Lahore
 Institute of Space Technology, Islamabad
 Space and Atmospheric Research Centre Library, Space and Upper Atmosphere Research Commission, Karachi, Pakistan

See also

 Economy of the Organisation of Islamic Cooperation

References

External links 

COMSTECH-ISESCO Research Grants
 Regional Library of Science and Technology

Organisation of Islamic Cooperation standing committees
International scientific organizations
Islamic organisations based in Pakistan